XES may refer to:

Grand Geneva Resort Airport, a resort airport near Milwaukee.
XHS-FM, a Mexican radio station originally known as XES-AM
XES (film) a 2014 film project directed by Ram Gopal Varma
Xbox Entertainment Studios, a video game developer
Xerox Escape Sequence, a printer page description language
Soft X-ray emission spectroscopy, a technique for determining the electronic structure of materials
Cross System Extended Services, a component of IBM's MVS Operating System
The "eXtensible Event Stream" interoperability standard, defined by IEEE 1849